The Kuwaiti ambassador in Beijing is the official representative of the Government in Kuwait City to the Government of the People's Republic of China.
The governments in Beijing and Kuwait City established diplomatic relations at the ambassadorial level on March 22, 1971.

List of representatives

References 

 
China
Kuwait